Kill la Kill is a 2013 anime television series created and produced by Trigger. The series, directed by Hiroyuki Imaishi and written by Kazuki Nakashima, follows Ryuko Matoi, a girl seeking out the wielder of a scissor blade who murdered her father. Her search takes her to Honnouji Academy, where the student council, led by Satsuki Kiryuin, use powerful uniforms known as Goku Uniforms to rule the school and its city in fear. Teaming up with a living uniform named Senketsu, Ryuko fights against Satsuki and the student council in order to find the answers she seeks.

Kill la Kill aired on MBS' Anime-ism programming block between October 4, 2013 and March 28, 2014, also airing on TBS, Chubu-Nippon Broadcasting and BS-TBS. The series was released on nine Blu-ray Disc and DVD volumes between January 8, 2014 and September 3, 2014, with an original video animation episode included on the final volume. The series is licensed in North America by Aniplex of America and was simulcasted on Crunchyroll, Hulu, and Daisuki.net. On television, the series aired on Adult Swim's Toonami block from February 8, 2015 to August 2, 2015. In Australia and New Zealand the series is streamed by Madman Entertainment. The show is available in the United Kingdom by Wakanim and is streamed on the All the Anime website.

The series uses four pieces of theme music: two opening themes and two ending themes.

The title of each episode is named after a Japanese classical pop song selected from within the iTunes collection of Kill la Kill head writer Kazuki Nakashima, an idea which he came up with as he wrote the script.

Episode list

Notes

References

External links
 

Kill la Kill